The 1997–98 NBA season was the Wizards' 37th season in the National Basketball Association. There was a new beginning for basketball in Washington, D.C. as the team changed its name to the "Wizards", fearing "Bullets" endorsed gun violence. The team revealed a new primary logo of a wizard conjuring a basketball in front of a quarter moon, and added new uniforms with blue, black and bronze colors. During the off-season, the team signed free agent Terry Davis to join their frontcourt, as Gheorghe Mureșan missed the entire season with a stretched right ankle tendon and right foot injury. The team also re-signed former Bullets guard Ledell Eackles for the third time after a one-year absence from the NBA.

The Wizards got off to a slow 5–11 start to the season, losing their first five home games at US Airways Arena, only winning games on the road such as defeating the Utah Jazz, 90–86 at the Delta Center on November 3, 1997, and the 2-time defending champion Chicago Bulls, 90–83 at the United Center on November 12. The Wizards played their final home game at US Airways Arena on November 29, 1997, losing 88–83 to the Bulls, and moved into their new arena, the MCI Center, where they won their first home game of the season, defeating the Seattle SuperSonics, 95–78 on December 2, and posting a 24–12 home record for the remainder of the season. The Wizards held a 25–24 record at the All-Star break, and won their final four games of the season to finish fourth in the Atlantic Division with a 42–40 record, but failed to qualify for the playoffs, finishing just one game behind the 8th-seeded New Jersey Nets.

Chris Webber averaged 21.9 points, 9.5 rebounds, 1.6 steals and 1.7 blocks per game, while Juwan Howard averaged 18.5 points and 7.0 rebounds per game, and Rod Strickland provided the team with 17.8 points, 5.3 rebounds, 10.5 assists, and 1.7 steals per game, and was named to the All-NBA Second Team. In addition, sixth man Tracy Murray provided scoring off the bench, averaging 15.1 points per game, while Calbert Cheaney contributed 12.8 points per game, and Davis provided with 4.4 points and 6.5 rebounds per game. 

Following the season, Webber was traded to the Sacramento Kings, while Harvey Grant signed as a free agent with the Philadelphia 76ers, and Mureșan and Eackles were both released to free agency. The team's new logo and uniforms both remained in use until 2007, where they switched to a lighter bronze color.

Offseason

Draft picks

The Wizards forfeited their 1997 first round draft pick in connection with the signing of Juwan Howard in 1996. Washington would have had the 17th pick.

Roster

Roster Notes
 Center Gheorghe Mureșan missed the entire season due to a stretched right ankle tendon and foot injury.

Regular season

Season standings

z – clinched division title
y – clinched division title
x – clinched playoff spot

Record vs. opponents

Game log

Player statistics

NOTE: Please write the players statistics in alphabetical order by last name.

Awards and records
 Rod Strickland, All-NBA Second Team

Transactions

References

See also
 1997–98 NBA season

Washington Wizards seasons
Wash
Wiz
Wiz